Zinab (also Romanized as Zīnāb) is a village in Sis Rural District, in the Central District of Shabestar County, East Azerbaijan Province, Iran. At the 2006 census, its population was 1,257, in 281 families.

References 

Populated places in Shabestar County